Thomas Cuisset (March 19, 1958 – January 19, 2017) was a French photographer. He was a resident artist at the Villa Medici in 1992. He won the Prix Moins Trente in 1987, and the Prix de photographie from the Académie des Beaux-Arts in 2009.

References

1958 births
2017 deaths
People from Maubeuge
People from Montreuil, Seine-Saint-Denis
French photographers
Deaths from cancer in France